Edward Arnold Lynch (April 29, 1929 – March 22, 1980) was an American cyclist. He competed in the individual and team road race events at the 1948 Summer Olympics.

References

External links
 

1929 births
1980 deaths
American male cyclists
Olympic cyclists of the United States
Cyclists at the 1948 Summer Olympics
Sportspeople from Canton, Ohio